Oliveira do Bairro Sport Clube is a Portuguese football club based in Oliveira do Bairro, Aveiro District. Founded in 1922, it currently competes in the fourth tier Terceira Divisão. The home ground is at the 2.000 seat capacity Oliveira do Bairro Municipal Stadium.

Appearances

Tier 3: 17
Tier 4: 17

Season to season

References

External links
Official site 
Zerozero team profile
Official blog 

Association football clubs established in 1922
Football clubs in Portugal
1922 establishments in Portugal
Sport in Oliveira do Bairro